Caverna de Santana (SP-041), also Caverna de Sant'Anna, is a cave located inside the Alto Ribeira Tourist State Park, along the road connecting the towns of Apiaí and Iporanga, to the south of the State of Sao Paulo, Brazil. The Flowers' Hall, displaying thousands of flowers of aragonite, and the Taqueupa Hall as one of the many other formations of great scenic beauty found in the cave, are ranked among the most beautiful and ornated of the world.

History
Discovered and described at the beginning of the twentieth century as "Caverna do Rio Roncador" by the German naturalist Richard Krone, it had the potential to become one of the deepest caves in the state, but ended up being one of the most important and visited caves in the country. It is the longest cave within the state area with a horizontal projection of 8.373 meters and unevenness of 61 meters. It is widely used for environmental education tours and photography.

See also
List of caves in Brazil

References

Notes

Sources

External links
Caverna de Santana - PETAR Online
Grupo Pierre Martin de Espeleologia

Limestone caves
Wild caves
Caves of São Paulo (state)
Tourist attractions in São Paulo (state)